The International Rally of Queensland, known previously as Rally Queensland, is a rally racing event held in the Gympie Region of Queensland, Australia run by the Brisbane Sporting Car Club. The rally was based for most of its out of the state capital Brisbane but in more recent times has moved north along the coast to various centres in the Sunshine Coast area. The rally begins in Caloundra before moving inland to forest roads in near Imbil and Kandanga. The rally was first held in 1968 as part of the original Australian Rally Championship and has been part of the ARC ever since.

With the end of the Rally of Canberra in 2008 and the Western Australian government ceasing its funding of Rally Australia in 2006 both the World and Asia-Pacific Rally Championships were both looking for new venues. Rally Queensland was selected for APRC duties and became the International Rally of Queensland in 2009.

In 2013, a competitor died after his car crashed in the Imbil State Forest.

List of winners
Sourced in part from:

See also

Motorsport in Australia
Sport in Queensland

References

Recurring sporting events established in 1968
Queensland
Queensland
International sports competitions hosted by Australia
1968 establishments in Australia
Motorsport in Queensland